Sowmeeh-ye Bozorg (also Romanized as Şowme‘eh-ye Bozorg; also known as Şowma‘eh-ye Bālā) is a village in Qalandarabad Rural District, Qalandarabad District, Fariman County, Razavi Khorasan Province, Iran. At the 2006 census, its population was 83, in 17 families.

References 

Populated places in Fariman County